Héritier Lumumba (formerly known as Harry O'Brien; born 15 November 1986) is a Brazilian-born Australian former professional Australian rules footballer who played for the Collingwood Football Club and Melbourne Football Club in the Australian Football League (AFL). 

Since his debut in 2005, he achieved All-Australian honours and won an AFL premiership, playing mostly as a half back. He is the first Brazilian-born player who played an AFL match.

Playing career

Collingwood 
The  Lumumba played most of his football as a medium defender. He was selected with pick 21 in the 2004 AFL Rookie Draft by Collingwood, and made his debut in Round 18 of 2005 against Fremantle at the MCG. He kicked a goal against the Kangaroos shortly after his debut, and did enough to be retained on the rookie list. In 2006 he showed more improvement and was elevated to the senior list again during the year, this time due to the absence of Sean Rusling, playing a total of nine games.

Coach Mick Malthouse at one point in an interview challenged the AFL's rules on rookies in response to not being able to permanently play Lumumba in the seniors on the basis of his excellent form.

He was elevated to the senior list for season 2007. In 2008, he came 5th in the Copeland Trophy count, Collingwood's best and fairest. In 2009, he came 4th in the Copeland Trophy.

He played in numbers 43, 30 and his final number 8. In 2010, he won All-Australian honours playing off the half-back flank. He was instrumental in Collingwood's 2010 grand final replay win over St Kilda and kicked a long goal from the boundary line late in the game.

Melbourne

Lumumba made his Melbourne debut in round 1, 2015, against , in what was also his 200th AFL game. He kicked a goal in a 26-point win for his new club.

Lumumba missed the round one match against  in 2016, before playing the next five matches; he missed the remainder of the season after suffering from concussion symptoms. Despite being cleared to train by Melbourne doctors, he did not return to pre-season training in November after being advised to retire by several specialists. He retired from AFL football in December.

Racism allegations 
In 2017, the documentary Fair Game was released about Heritier's life and his stories of racism while playing professional football. He called the culture at Collingwood a "boys' club for racist and sexist jokes" and stated that his teammates nicknamed him "chimp", a term with a strong history of connotations as a racial slur against black people. He stood up to the racism and continues to do so.

On Network 10's The Project, Lumumba was interviewed by Waleed Aly about his experiences and was disappointed in Aly's response to the interview, as Lumumba felt that he approached the interview with the "preconceived idea that we would both see eye to eye on the basic truths of racism/white supremacy ... However, it is now very clear to me, that he and I have fundamental differences in our understanding of what racism/white supremacy is, and how it should be effectively dealt with." Lumumba felt that he was undermined by Aly and claimed that Aly was indifferent to racism.

In 2020, the feud was again reported in the media when Lumumba called The Project "unethical and dishonest" in their treatment of him. He said that Collingwood coach, Nathan Buckley, told him to back off his accusations because it would throw the club president, Eddie McGuire, "under the bus".

Collingwood wanted to sit down with Lumumba to reconcile, but Lumumba refused until he received a full acknowledgement and apology over his treatment. 

Lumumba's accounts of racism were rejected by former coach Mick Malthouse, Buckley and McGuire, but they were affirmed by a number of players including Chris Dawes, Brent Macaffer, Leon Davis, Andrew Krakouer, Chris Egan and Shae McNamara. Former Melbourne coach Paul Roos also confirmed hearing Lumumba's account and was "shocked" when Lumumba told him of the culture at Collingwood and what he had endured.

In 2021, the Do Better report was leaked to the Australian media. The report found the Collingwood Football Club guilty of systemic racism. This has led to calls for The Project, and hosts Waleed Aly and Peter Helliar, to apologise on-air. Helliar has written an apology, "This report is heartbreaking. To @iamlumumba I am truly, unequivocally sorry. I should have believed you. I will do better." A few days later, the interview was no longer accessible on the program's Facebook account. A former executive producer at Network 10 stated, "What 'The Project' should do right now is show a bit of that clip, have Waleed and Pete sit there and talk about it and the lessons they've learned and what they'll do going forward."

Personal life
Lumumba was born to a Afro-Brazilian mother and a Congolese-Angolan father in Rio de Janeiro, and moved to Perth, Australia when he was 3 years old. He was raised by his Australian stepfather and was 19 years old when he was reunited with his father, after spending 13 years apart. He supported the Essendon Bombers as a child, with his family owning a pet dog named Sheedy after the long-time Essendon coach Kevin Sheedy.

He went to school at Rossmoyne Primary from 1994 to 1999 and then Rossmoyne Senior High School.

Lumumba's surname was changed to "O'Brien" when he was 9 years old and was given the nickname "Harry" shortly after, becoming known as "Harry O'Brien". In December 2013, he changed his surname back to "Lumumba" and discontinued the use of the nickname "Harry", citing his journey of decolonisation as the reason for the change.

Lumumba became the AFL's first multicultural ambassador and worked to engage migrant communities through football. He was the AFL's multicultural ambassador from 2006 to 2013. In 2012, Prime Minister Julia Gillard recognised Lumumba as one of the People of Australia ambassadors. He was also made the ambassador to the Dalai Lama's visit to Australia in June 2011.

Statistics

|- style="background-color: #EAEAEA"
! scope="row" style="text-align:center" | 2005
|
| 43 || 4 || 1 || 1 || 22 || 16 || 38 || 8 || 7 || 0.3 || 0.3 || 5.5 || 4.0 || 9.5 || 2.0 || 1.8
|- 
! scope="row" style="text-align:center" | 2006
|
| 43 || 9 || 0 || 0 || 51 || 43 || 94 || 25 || 12 || 0.0 || 0.0 || 5.7 || 4.8 || 10.4 || 2.8 || 1.3
|- style="background:#eaeaea;"
! scope="row" style="text-align:center" | 2007
|
| 30 || 23 || 0 || 1 || 153 || 93 || 246 || 74 || 57 || 0.0 || 0.0 || 6.7 || 4.0 || 10.7 || 3.2 || 2.5
|- 
! scope="row" style="text-align:center" | 2008
|
| 8 || 24 || 2 || 1 || 189 || 140 || 329 || 106 || 45 || 0.1 || 0.0 || 7.9 || 5.8 || 13.7 || 4.4 || 1.9
|- style="background:#eaeaea;"
! scope="row" style="text-align:center" | 2009
|
| 8 || 25 || 5 || 0 || 230 || 172 || 402 || 106 || 45 || 0.2 || 0.0 || 9.2 || 6.9 || 16.1 || 4.2 || 1.8
|- 
! scope="row" style="text-align:center" | 2010
|
| 8 || 26 || 6 || 4 || 264 || 142 || 406 || 99 || 62 || 0.2 || 0.2 || 10.2 || 5.5 || 15.6 || 3.8 || 2.4
|- style="background:#eaeaea;"
! scope="row" style="text-align:center" | 2011
|
| 8 || 24 || 1 || 2 || 245 || 176 || 421 || 110 || 43 || 0.0 || 0.1 || 10.2 || 7.3 || 17.5 || 4.6 || 1.8
|- 
! scope="row" style="text-align:center" | 2012
|
| 8 || 24 || 3 || 2 || 239 || 146 || 385 || 94 || 58 || 0.1 || 0.1 || 10.0 || 6.1 || 16.0 || 3.9 || 2.4
|- style="background:#eaeaea;"
! scope="row" style="text-align:center" | 2013
|
| 8 || 19 || 7 || 10 || 263 || 161 || 424 || 105 || 47 || 0.4 || 0.5 || 13.8 || 8.5 || 22.3 || 5.5 || 2.5
|- 
! scope="row" style="text-align:center" | 2014
|
| 8 || 21 || 3 || 5 || 222 || 198 || 420 || 82 || 55 || 0.1 || 0.2 || 10.6 || 9.4 || 20.0 || 3.9 || 2.6
|- style="background:#eaeaea;"
! scope="row" style="text-align:center" | 2015
|
| 8 || 19 || 2 || 1 || 143 || 127 || 270 || 61 || 61 || 0.1 || 0.1 || 7.5 || 6.7 || 14.2 || 3.2 || 3.2
|-
! scope="row" style="text-align:center" | 2016
|
| 8 || 5 || 0 || 0 || 41 || 45 || 86 || 21 || 8 || 0.0 || 0.0 || 8.2 || 9.0 || 17.2 || 4.2 || 1.6
|- class="sortbottom"
! colspan=3| Career
! 223
! 30
! 27
! 2062
! 1459
! 3521
! 891
! 500
! 0.1
! 0.1
! 9.3
! 6.5
! 15.8
! 4.0
! 2.2
|}

Honours and achievements
Team
AFL premiership: 2010
McClelland Trophy (2): 2010, 2011
Individual
All-Australian: 2010

Books
Lumumba published a book in 2014 called It's Cool to be Conscious, that includes personal stories from his life, both on and off the field.

References

External links 
 

 

1986 births
Living people
VFL/AFL players born outside Australia
All-Australians (AFL)
Collingwood Football Club players
Collingwood Football Club Premiership players
Melbourne Football Club players
Australian rules footballers from Western Australia
Brazilian emigrants to Australia
Australian people of Brazilian descent
Australian people of Democratic Republic of the Congo descent
Australian people of Angolan descent
Brazilian people of Democratic Republic of the Congo descent
Brazilian people of Angolan descent
Sportspeople of Angolan descent
Sportspeople from Rio de Janeiro (city)
People educated at Rossmoyne Senior High School
One-time VFL/AFL Premiership players